Tiger Mountain may refer to:

Places
 Tiger Mountain (Washington), United States
 Tiger Mountain, a summit of 
Rabun County, Georgia, U.S.
 Hushan Great Wall, or Tiger Mountain, Liaoning, China
 Tygerberg Nature Reserve, Bellville, Western Cape, South Africa
 Tuxedo Ridge Ski Center, on a ridge known locally as Tiger Mountain, New York, U.S.
 Tiger Mountain, Uşak, Turkey

Fictional place
 Tiger Mountain, a fictional mountain in Qu Bo's novel Tracks in the Snowy Forest, adapted into
 Taking Tiger Mountain by Strategy, Peking opera
 Taking Tiger Mountain by Strategy (film), 1970
 The Taking of Tiger Mountain, 2014 film

Other uses
Several trophies called Tiger Mountain of the Ham Polo Club, London
"Tiger Mountain", a track on the 2009 album Life on Earth'' by Tiny Vipers

See also
Tiger (disambiguation)
Taking Tiger Mountain by Strategy (disambiguation)
 Mount Longhu, Dragon Tiger Mountain, Jiangxi, China